In organic chemistry, an alkyl group is an alkane missing one hydrogen.
The term alkyl is intentionally unspecific to include many possible substitutions. 
A cycloalkyl group is derived from a cycloalkane by removal of a hydrogen atom from a ring and has the general formula .
Typically an alkyl is a part of a larger molecule. In structural formulae, the symbol R is used to designate a generic (unspecified) alkyl group. The smallest alkyl group is methyl, with the formula .

Related concepts 
Alkylation is an important operation in refineries, for example in the production of high-octane gasoline. 

Alkylating antineoplastic agents are a class of compounds that are used to treat cancer.  In such case, the term alkyl is used loosely.  For example, nitrogen mustards are well-known alkylating agents, but they are not simple hydrocarbons.

In chemistry, alkyl is a group, a substituent, that is attached to other molecular fragments.  For example, alkyl lithium reagents have the empirical formula Li(alkyl), where alkyl = methyl, ethyl, etc. A dialkyl ether is an ether with two alkyl groups, e.g., diethyl ether (O(C2H5)2).

In medicinal chemistry
In medicinal chemistry, the incorporation of alkyl chains into some chemical compounds increases their lipophilicity.  This strategy has been used to increase the antimicrobial activity of flavanones and chalcones.

Alkyl cations, anions, and radicals
Usually, alkyl groups are attached to other atoms or groups of atoms.  Free alkyls occur as neutral compounds, as anions, or as cations. The cations are called carbocations. The anions are called carbanions. The neutral alkyl free radicals have no special name. Such species are usually encountered only as transient intermediates, but some are quite stable and can be "put into a bottle". Typically alkyl cations are generated using super acids, alkyl anions are observed in the presence of strong bases, and alkyl radicals are generated by a photochemical reaction. Alkyls are commonly observed in mass spectrometry of organic compounds.

Nomenclature
Alkyls form homologous series. The simplest series have the general formula CnH2n+1. Alkyls include methyl, (CH3·), ethyl (C2H5·), propyl (C3H7·), butyl (C4H9·), pentyl (C5H11·), and so on. Alkyl groups that contain one ring have the formula CnH2n−1, e.g. cyclopropyl and cyclohexyl.
The naming convention is taken from IUPAC nomenclature:

These names  are used to name branched chained structures, for example 3-methylpentane:

The structure of 3-methylpentane is viewed as consisting of two parts. First, five atoms comprise the longest straight chain of carbon centers.  The parent five-carbon compound is named pentane (highlighted blue). The methyl "substituent" or "group" is highlighted red. According to the usual rules of nomenclature, alkyl groups are included in the name of the molecule before the root, as in methylpentane. This name is, however, ambiguous, as the methyl branch could be on various carbon atoms. Thus, the name is 3-methylpentane to avoid ambiguity: The 3- is because the methyl is attached to the third of the five carbon atoms.

If there is more than one of the same alkyl group attached to a chain, then the prefixes are used on the alkyl groups to indicate multiples (i.e., di, tri, tetra, etc.)

This compound is known as 2,3,3-trimethylpentane. Here three identical alkyl groups attached to carbon atoms 2, 3, and 3. The numbers are included in the name to avoid ambiguity about the position of the groups, and "tri" indicates that there are three identical methyl groups. If one of the methyl groups attached to the third carbon atom were instead an ethyl group, then the name would be 3-ethyl-2,3-dimethylpentane. When there are different alkyl groups, they are listed in alphabetical order.

In addition, each position on an alkyl chain can be described according to how many other carbon atoms are attached to it. The terms primary, secondary, tertiary, and quaternary refer to a carbon attached to one, two, three, or four other carbons respectively.

Etymology
The first named alkyl radical was ethyl, named so by Liebig in 1833 from the German word "Äther" (which in turn had been derived from the Greek word "aither") (https://en.wiktionary.org/wiki/ether , i.e., the substance now known as diethyl ether) and the Greek word ύλη (hyle), meaning "matter". This was followed by methyl (Dumas and Peligot in 1834, meaning "spirit of wood") and amyl (Auguste Cahours in 1840). The word alkyl was introduced by Johannes Wislicenus in or before 1882, based on the German word "Alkoholradikale" and then-common suffix -yl.

See also

 Alkane
 Alkene
 Alkyne
 Aryl
 Hydrocarbon
 IUPAC nomenclature of organic chemistry

References

Substituents